Marooma is a locality in far western New South Wales, Australia, approximately 20 km south-east of Bourke. A railway station on the Main West line was situated there between 1891 and 1957. The station was opened as Goondabooka, before being changed to Gundabooka in 1892 and finally to Marooma in 1900.

References

Disused regional railway stations in New South Wales
Railway stations in Australia opened in 1891
Railway stations closed in 1957